Morris Possoni (born 1 July 1984) is an Italian professional road bicycle racer, who last rode for UCI ProTeam .

His best moment was in the 2008 Giro d'Italia, where he wore the white jersey as leader of the young rider classification. His future ambition is to reach the podium in a Grand Tour.

Palmares

2004
 3rd Overall Giro della Valle d'Aosta
2005
 1st Overall Giro della Valle d'Aosta
 1st Stage 1
2008
 9th, Giro di Lombardia
 44th Overall, Giro d'Italia
2009
 6th Trofeo Inca
 7th Overall Settimana internazionale di Coppi e Bartali
 1st Stage 3 TTT Tour de Romandie
 1st Stage 1 TTT Giro d'Italia
2010
 7th Gran Premio dell'Insubria-Lugano
 8th Overall Tour of Austria
 2nd Overall Brixia Tour
 5th Overall Vuelta a Burgos
2011
 5th Overall Tour Méditerranéen
 7th Overall Tour of Austria
 6th Overall Brixia Tour

References

External links 

Italian male cyclists
1984 births
Living people
Cyclists from the Province of Bergamo